Evan Duane Felker (born March 24, 1984) is an American singer, songwriter and guitarist from Okemah, Oklahoma. He is best known as the lead singer of the band Turnpike Troubadours.

Early life
Felker was born in Okemah and raised in Wright City, a small town in rural southeast Oklahoma. His mother, Tane, worked in the healthcare industry and his father, Van, was a cowboy. He has one younger sister, Cheyenne. He was part of "an outdoorsy family that did a lot of hunting and fishing". Growing up, Felker enjoyed short stories and wrote poems and creative prose. He started playing guitar at the age of fifteen, learning from books and from high school friends. He initially began writing rock songs since he considered country music to be uncool. Felker's uncle was a songwriter and rock musician, and Felker travelled to Tulsa, Oklahoma as a teenager to watch him perform. Felker attended tech school to train as an electrician and later worked in paper mills, food plants, and Mercury Marine in Stillwater, Oklahoma.

Career
When Felker moved to Stillwater, Oklahoma in his twenties, he became interested in country music; his "heroes" were Cross Canadian Ragweed and Jason Boland. He and guitarist Ryan Engleman began playing as a two-man acoustic act and were joined by bass player R.C. Edwards two months later. Eventually, drummer Giovanni “Nooch” Carnuccio III and fiddler Kyle Nix joined, and formed the Turnpike Troubadours. The band later relocated to Tahlequah, Oklahoma.

The Turnpike Troubadours announced they were taking a hiatus in May 2019, saying they would not perform "until a time we feel that everyone is of strong mind, body and spirit". In November 2021, the band announced its reunion. The band opened their return at Cains Ballroom in Oklahoma, the start of a series of sold out shows throughout 2022.

Personal life
Felker is a keen hunter, crediting his Oklahoma upbringing to bringing him into the culture. He is friends with country singer-songwriter Corb Lund, and the two have hunted together.
Felker married accountant Staci Nelson in November 2016, in Barcelona, Spain. They split in February 2018 and were divorced that August.

Before the Turnpike Troubadours went on hiatus, there were multiple reports of Felker appearing intoxicated during his performances, along with the band cancelling over a dozen shows. In an August 2020 interview with Rolling Stone, Felker said he had found sobriety and was working on a ranch in Texas. He reconciled with Nelson, who revealed on her Instagram page that they had remarried in June 2020. They welcomed their first child, a daughter, in January 2021.

See also
 Turnpike Troubadours

References

External links
 TurnpikeTroubadours.com (official site)

Living people
1984 births